Oakville is an unincorporated community in St. Mary's County, Maryland, United States. Sandgates On Cat Creek, a historic home in Oakville, was listed on the National Register of Historic Places in 1978. The area was the scene of the murder of Stephanie Roper.

References

Unincorporated communities in St. Mary's County, Maryland
Unincorporated communities in Maryland